Farmen 2019 (The Farm 2019) was the 12th season of the Swedish version of The Farm reality television show. The show premiered on 6 January 2019 on TV4. The season concluded on 17 March 2019 when Tobias Möller won against Emelie Karlsson in a final duel to become this year's farmer.

Format
Contestants from all across Sweden are chosen to live on a farm like it was 100 years ago. Every week, one contestant is designated to be the head of the farm. They must choose someone to take part in a duel. The person is chosen for the duel then selects someone of the same gender to compete against them in the duel where the loser is kicked out of the farm. Starting in week two, the contestant who was evicted from the farm decides who the new head of the farm shall be.

Finishing order
(ages stated are at time of contest)

Torpet
Returning from the previous season is Torpet. This time, four new contestants start off on Torpet, trying to win a spot to get on the farm while each week facing against contestants who lost the duel on the farm, as they themselves try to win a spot back onto the farm.

The game

References

External links

The Farm (franchise)
Reality television articles with incorrect naming style
2019 Swedish television seasons